Bradash is a village in Podujevë municipality.
Bradash was populated by Albanians who came from the Gashi tribe who settled there and many others came from Mitrovica.

Notes

References 

Villages in Podujevo